The men's 3000 metres steeplechase event at the 2006 African Championships in Athletics was held at the Stade Germain Comarmond on August 11.

Results

Note: Ezekiel Kemboi originally finished second but was disqualified for improper hurdling.

References
Results 

2006 African Championships in Athletics
Steeplechase at the African Championships in Athletics